Dennis McGuire may refer to:

 Execution of Dennis McGuire (1960–2014), American convicted murderer executed in Ohio
 Dennis McGuire (canoeist) (born 1939), Australian sprint canoeist
 G. Dennis McGuire, American Church of God pastor